Tagget (alternative title Dragonfire) is a 1991 crime drama / spy movie telemovie directed by Richard T. Heffron. The film's title character, a disabled Vietnam War veteran and director of an electronics firm, investigates an attempt to kill him.

External links

American spy films
1990s action films
1991 television films
1991 films
American television films
Films directed by Richard T. Heffron
1990s crime drama films
American crime drama films
1990s English-language films
1990s American films